Myriotrema whalleyanum is a species of corticolous (bark-dwelling) lichen in the family Graphidaceae. Found in Thailand, it was formally described as a new species in 2002 by lichenologists Natsurang Homchantara and Brian J. Coppins. The lichen has a smooth and shiny, pale straw-coloured thallus with a dense cortex and a white medulla. It makes large, colourless and thick-walled muriform (chambered) ascospores typically measuring 84–105.5 by 22.5–30.5 μm. Myriotrema whalleyanum does not contain any lichen products. The specific epithet honours Anthony Whalley, emeritus professor at Liverpool John Moores University.

References

whalleyanum
Lichen species
Lichens described in 2002
Lichens of Thailand
Taxa named by Brian John Coppins
Taxa named by Natsurang Homchantara